Tom Raffield is a British lighting and homeware designer.

Career 

Tom Raffield Ltd was founded by Tom in 2008. Inspired by his degree in 3D Sustainability and Design undertaken at Falmouth College of Arts, Tom sought to further his interest in the traditional, eco-friendly practice of steam bending by starting his own business. Through hours of hard work, designing through making, experimenting and prototyping, Tom forged the origins, sensibility and the iconic curved aesthetic that the brand still proudly create today. Over a decade later and still passionate about education, Tom has passed on his skills and taught his steam bending practice to a team of talented workshop makers. Tom now spends most of his time designing products for the fast-growing Tom Raffield range and large-scale bespoke projects, including the Royal Parks kiosks and RHS Chelsea Flower Show, but also developing innovative new designs through the creative medium of hands-on making.

Raffield was co-founder of the award-winning collective design company Sixixis, recognised for unique aesthetic, forward-thinking designs

Inspiration 

Tom Raffield grew up in Exmoor, England - where the natural environment stimulated his imagination, and fed into his future designs. 
Raffield’s fascination with the traditional practice of steam bending  began whilst studying at Falmouth College of Arts, where he discovered the traditional technique of using a chamber wouldn’t allow him to create the complex 3D bends he had envisaged. Years of research and experimentation allowed him to develop a new steaming method to turn his design visions into reality and create furniture designs such as the Chaise Longue, Arc Chair and Loop Chair and Lights including the No.1 Pendant, Cage Light and Butterfly Pendant.

Awards 

Winner of the Lighting Design Association’s Lighting Design Award 2011.

Winner of the Walpole Brands of Tomorrow Award for Emerging Talent 2017.

Chelsea Flower Show 2019  five star tradestand award.

Finalist of the RHS Chelsea Flower Show Product of the Year Award 2019, with an innovative steam bent outdoor planter.

Darc Award Winner 2019 -  Arame Wall Light, sustainable design and manufacture

References

External links 

Year of birth missing (living people)
Living people
British woodworkers